Joe Lansdale may refer to:

 Joe R. Lansdale (born 1951), American writer and martial arts instructor
 Joe Lansdale (footballer) (1894–1977), English football goalkeeper